Alex Kay-Jelski is a British sports journalist, currently the editor-in-chief of The Athletic. He was previously the sports editor of The Times and the Daily Mail newspapers.

Early life and education 
Kay-Jelski was educated at University College School in London, and then graduated with an MA in French and Spanish at the University of Edinburgh in 2007.

Career 
Kay-Jelski began his career as a graduate trainee and sub-editor at the Daily Mail in 2007. He was promoted to deputy sports news editor in 2009 before being named sports editor in 2015. He left the Mail less than a year later to become sports editor at The Times.

Key-Jelski was recruited in June 2019 to join the startup US sports website The Athletic. He has also appeared on Sky Sports and TalkSport radio.

References

External links 
 Alex Kay-Jelski on Twitter

British sports journalists
British newspaper editors
Year of birth missing (living people)
The Times people
Daily Mail journalists
Living people
People educated at University College School
Alumni of the University of Edinburgh
British sportswriters